The 2018 IsarOpen was a professional tennis tournament played on clay courts. It was the 1st edition of the tournament which was part of the 2018 ATP Challenger Tour. It took place in Pullach, Germany between 6 August and 12 August 2018.

Singles main-draw entrants

Seeds

 1 Rankings are as of 30 July 2018.

Other entrants
The following players received wildcards into the singles main draw:
  Daniel Masur
  Rudolf Molleker
  Tim Pütz
  Jan-Lennard Struff

The following players received entry into the singles main draw as special exempts:
  Pedro Cachín
  Gonçalo Oliveira

The following players received entry from the qualifying draw:
  Kimmer Coppejans
  Kevin Krawietz
  Gianluca Mager
  Mikael Ymer

The following players received entry as lucky losers:
  Alen Avidzba
  Arthur De Greef
  Alexandre Müller

Champions

Singles

  Pedro Sousa def.  Jan-Lennard Struff 6–1, 6–3.

Doubles

  Sander Gillé /  Joran Vliegen def.  Simone Bolelli /  Daniele Bracciali 6–2, 6–2.

External links
Official Website

2018 ATP Challenger Tour